Foya Airport  is an airport serving the town of Foya, in Lofa County, Liberia.

See also
 Transport in Liberia

References

 Great Circle Mapper - Foya
 Google Earth

Airports in Liberia
Lofa County